Jean-François Laterrade (23 January 1784 – 30 October 1858) was a French botanist born in Bordeaux. He was a founding member of Linnean Society of Bordeaux, and was director of the botanical garden at Bordeaux.

In 1811 Laterrade published a work involving flora found in the environs of Bordeaux called "Flore bordelaise, ou Tableau des plantes qui croissent naturellement aux environs de Bordeaux". This book was re-issued in 1821, 1829 and 1846. In 1823 he founded a popular agricultural journal titled "L'Ami des champs" (The Friend of the Fields).

The mycological genus Laterradea (Raspail, 1824) is named after him.

References 
 Index des Botanistes, Fleurs Sauvages de l'Yonne (translated from French)

19th-century French botanists
1784 births
1858 deaths
Scientists from Bordeaux